Nikolai Andreyevich Kovalenko (born October 17, 1999) is an American-born Russian professional ice hockey forward. He is currently playing for Torpedo Nizhny Novgorod in the Kontinental Hockey League (KHL). He was selected in the sixth round, 171st overall, by the Colorado Avalanche in the 2018 NHL Entry Draft. He is the son of former NHL player, Andrei Kovalenko.

Early life
Kovalenko was born in Raleigh, North Carolina, at the beginning of the 1999–2000 season, in which his father Andrei Kovalenko, was playing with the Carolina Hurricanes of the National Hockey League. Kovalenko returned to Russia as a two-year-old following the conclusion of Andrei's 9-year career in the NHL, and lived in Yaroslavl.

Playing career
Kovalenko learned to play as youth within the ranks of the Lokomotiv Yaroslavl hockey school, while his father played with the KHL club. Unable to play in the renowned style of his father, who was known as "The Tank", Nikolai focused on a more technical skill based game. He made his debut in the MHL with Loko Yaroslavl during the 2015–16 season, scoring 4 goals and 5 points in 4 games as a 16-year-old. Showing offensive potential, through Loko's second tier junior club, Loko juniors, Kovalenko was promoted to remain for the majority of the 2016–17 season in the MHL, producing a modest 14 points in 35 games.

In continuing in the MHL in the 2017–18 season, Kovalenko's improved strength was evident as he increased his offensive output with Loko in scoring 10 goals and 31 points in just 33 games appearing in the MHL All-Star Game. On February 27, 2018, he was promoted to make his professional debut in the Kontinental Hockey League as an 18-year-old, playing 11 minutes in a 2–0 road victory over Spartak Moscow. Remaining on the roster for the playoffs, Kovalenko made his post-season debut in the first-round series victory over Torpedo Nizhny Novgorod, and appeared scoreless in four post-season games before he was returned to the MHL following defeat to SKA Saint Petersburg. Kovalenko continued upon his successful season in producing 12 points in 13 playoff games with Loko, helping capture the Kharlamov Cup.

Gaining the attention of NHL scouts, Kovalenko was ranked 33rd amongst international skaters, before he was selected in the sixth round, 171st overall, by the Colorado Avalanche in the 2018 NHL Entry Draft. He followed in his father's footsteps who was drafted by the Quebec Nordiques in the 1990 NHL Entry Draft and played three-plus seasons with the Quebec/Colorado franchise.

On August 2, 2018, Kovalenko was signed to an improved three-year contract to continue his development and remain within Lokomotiv Yaroslavl. In the 2018–19 season, Kovalenko scored his first professional goal in an opening night 5–0 victory over Sibir Novosibirsk on September 4, 2018. Playing in a reduced role due to his youth, Kovalenko still contributed offensively, scoring 2 goals, including the game-winner, in a 4–3 victory over HC Vityaz on September 20, 2018. He was later named as the KHL's best rookie of the week for a second occasion.

In the 2019–20 season, Kovalenko returned on his potential in establishing himself within the top 9 forwards and recording career bests with 10 goals, 11 assists and 21 points through 54 regular season games with Lokomotiv. In his final season under contract with Lokomotiv while under the guidance of new head coach, Craig McTavish, Kovalenko struggled to make an impression. With MacTavish later replaced by Andrei Skabelka, Kovalenko was unable to replicate his previous season contributions, totalling just 6 goals and 11 points through the 2020–21 season.

On 25 May 2021, Kovalenko was signed to a qualifying offer from rival club, Ak Bars Kazan, in which Lokomotiv chose not to match. Re-uniting with head coach Dmitri Kvartalnov, Kovalenko agreed to a two-year contract with Ak Bars through 2023. In the 2021–22 season, Kovalenko after a promising start with Ak Bars, was limited through injuries by appearing in just 29 games and collecting 6 goals and 14 points. Unable to fully establish himself within the club, Kovalenko was granted an early release from the remaining year of his contract.

On 26 May 2022, Kovalenko was signed to a two-year contract through 2024 to join his third KHL outfit, Torpedo Nizhny Novgorod.

International play

 

 

Kovalenko first represented Russia at the junior level at the 2015 World U-17 Hockey Challenge, featuring in 6 games. He went on to appear with Russia at the 2018 World Junior A Challenge, there, he would score a key goal in the Finals, ending the tournament with three goals and five assists.

Kovalenko returned to the national stage after he was selected to the Russian team for the 2019 World Junior Championships in Vancouver, Canada. In Russia's second tournament game, Kovalenko was selected as the player of the game after scoring his first goal and point, notching the game-winner shorthanded, in a 2–1 victory over the Czech Republic on December 28, 2018. He ended the tournament with 3 points in 6 games, helping Russia claim the Bronze medal against Switzerland on January 6, 2019.

Career statistics

Regular season and playoffs

International

Awards and honours

References

External links

1999 births
Living people
Ak Bars Kazan players
Colorado Avalanche draft picks
Lokomotiv Yaroslavl players
Russian ice hockey right wingers
Torpedo Nizhny Novgorod players